

References

L